Ceratocrania is a genus of praying mantises in the family Hymenopodidae.  Species are recorded from Malesia.

Species
The Mantodea Species File lists:
 Ceratocrania macra Westwood, 1889 - type species
 Ceratocrania malayae'' Wood-Mason, 1889

References

External links

Mantodea of Asia
Mantidae
Mantodea genera